Tachibana-dera (橘寺) is a Buddhist temple in Asuka, Nara Prefecture, Japan. It is affiliated with Tendai Buddhism. According to legend, it was founded by Prince Shōtoku.

See also 

Historical Sites of Prince Shōtoku

Buddhist temples in Nara Prefecture
Buddhist archaeological sites in Japan
Tendai temples
Prince Shōtoku